The 2000 New Zealand rugby league tour of Great Britain was a tour by the New Zealand national rugby league team to compete at the 2000 Rugby League World Cup. New Zealand dominated Group 1 of the tournament thrashing Lebanon, the Cook Islands and Wales with a combined score of 206–28, before winning their quarter-final against France and their semi-final against England to qualify for the final. In the final, they lost to defending champions Australia 12-40 to finish runners-up in a World Cup tournament for the second time.

Background
Alongside Australia and France, New Zealand had competed at all eleven previous World Cups. New Zealand finished runner up in 1988.

The twelfth World Cup was scheduled to be held in Great Britain, Ireland and France in 2000, following on from the successful 1995 Rugby League World Cup. New Zealand was granted automatic entry into the 2000 World Cup.

Build up
In the twelves months prior to the World Cup, New Zealand had finished second at the 1999 Rugby League Tri-Nations, losing to Australia 20–22 in the final, before losing the 2000 Anzac test match by a record margin of 0-52.

For the first, and to date only, time, the New Zealand Māori rugby league team were invited to compete in the World Cup as Aotearoa Māori. Their squad included several past New Zealand representatives who were not selected for the final squad.

Staff
Head Coach: Frank Endacott
Manager: Gary Cooksley (Auckland)

Squad

  Note*: includes a field goal.

Fixtures

Group B

Lebanon

New Zealand:1. Richie Barnett (c), 2. Leslie Vainikolo, 3. Tonie Carroll, 4. Willie Talau, 5. Brian Jellick, 6. Henry Paul, 7. Stacey Jones8. Smith, 9. Swain, 10. Pongia, 11. Logan Swann, 12. Kearney, 13. Ruben Wiki.Substitutes: Joe Vagana, Robbie Paul, Rua, Cayless.Coach:Frank Endacott

Cook Islands

Wales

Quarter final

Semi-final

This was the England rugby league team's biggest ever loss. By winning this match, New Zealand had again equaled their record for consecutive victories with five.

Final

Australia led at half time 6–0, after a dominant first half.

At the start of the second half, Nathan Hindmarsh scored to take the lead to 12-0 before Lesley Vainikolo pounced on a loose ball to dive over on 49 minutes. When Henry Paul landed the conversion, the deficit was back down to six points. Soon after, Australian halfback, Brett Kimmorley, made a break down the right before feeding the ball inside to fullback Darren Lockyer, who crossed for another try. Rogers' third successful kick made it 18–6 to the defending champions. However, the Kiwis quickly struck back when Tonie Carroll beat several Australian defenders to score. Henry Paul's conversion made it 18–12.

New Zealand then made several crucial errors and Australia were able to capitalise. Sailor grabbed two tries in the space of five minutes to take his tally for the tournament to 10 tries. The first of them came on 63 minutes courtesy of a reverse pass from Gidley. Rogers missed the second of the two quick conversions. Skipper Fittler then breached the New Zealand defence on 73 minutes to score his first try of the final which was converted by Rogers. Substitute Trent Barrett then finished the scoring, with a try that was converted by Rogers.

Aftermath
The tournament was coach Frank Endacott's last in charge of New Zealand, and he was replaced by Gary Freeman for the 2001 season.

Tonie Carroll later switched his eligibility to Australia and played seven tests for the Kangaroos.

New Zealand next toured Great Britain in 2002. The next World Cup was held in Australia in 2008, and was won by New Zealand.

References

2000
World Cup
2000
2000 Rugby League World Cup